Julio Bernad Valmaseda (17 October 1928 – 9 July 2014) was a Spanish professional footballer who played as a defender for Huesca and Real Zaragoza.

References

1928 births
2014 deaths
Spanish footballers
SD Huesca footballers
Real Zaragoza players
La Liga players
Association football defenders